Binabinaaine, or pinapinaaine, (with the meaning of "becoming a woman" in Gilbertese) are people who identify themselves as having a third-gender role in Kiribati and Tuvalu, and previously in the Gilbert and Ellice Islands which reunited the two archipelagoes. These are people whose sex is assigned male at birth, but who embody female gendered behaviours. 

The term comes from Gilbertese and has been loaned into Tuvaluan; it can be used as a noun, a verb or an adverb. There are similarities between the societal roles that pinapinaaine share with other gender liminal communities from the Pacific, including the Samoan fa'afafine and the Tongan fakaleiti. 

According to anthropologist Gilbert Herdt, binabinaaine are known for their performances (dancing and singing mainly) and their ability to comment on the appearance and behaviour of Gilbertese and Tuvaluan men. Herdt also wrote that some Tuvaluans view pinapinaaine as a "borrowing" from Kiribati whence other "'undesirable' traits of Tuvaluan culture, like sorcery, are thought to have originated", but those ideas are mainly spread by Protestant churches as Church of Tuvalu originated from Samoa, where the equivalent of binabinaaine also exists. He also described how, in Funafuti, young women are often friends with older pinapinaaine.

References 

Gender in Oceania
Gender systems
Tuvaluan culture
Third gender
Transgender in Oceania
Society of Tuvalu
Indigenous LGBT culture
Kiribati culture
Gender in Kiribati
Gender in Tuvalu